The 2001–02 Combined Counties Football League season was the 24th in the history of the Combined Counties Football League, a football competition in England.

League table

The league featured 21 clubs from the previous season, along with one new club:
Withdean 2000, returned to the league system after resigning from the Sussex Football League in 2000

League table

External links
 Combined Counties League Official Site

2001-02
2001–02 in English football leagues